St. James's Episcopal Church is an historic Episcopal church at 1991 Massachusetts Avenue in Cambridge, Massachusetts. The parish was founded in 1864 as a mission from Christ Church.  The Richardsonian Romanesque building was built in 1888–89 to a design by Henry M. Congdon. The church was built on the site of the Davenport Tavern, a landmark that had stood on that site since c. 1757 (a portion of which was relocated to Somerville, where it still stands).

The church building was listed on the National Register of Historic Places in 1983.

See also
 National Register of Historic Places listings in Cambridge, Massachusetts

References

External links

Episcopal church buildings in Massachusetts
Churches completed in 1888
19th-century Episcopal church buildings
Romanesque Revival church buildings in Massachusetts
Churches on the National Register of Historic Places in Massachusetts
Churches in Cambridge, Massachusetts
Stone churches in Massachusetts
National Register of Historic Places in Cambridge, Massachusetts